WRLV (1140 AM) was a radio station broadcasting an oldies format. Established in 1979, the station was licensed to serve Salyersville, Kentucky, United States.  WRLV was owned by Morgan County Industries, Inc. WRLV surrendered its license on April 11, 2017.

References

External links
FCC Station Search Details: DWRLV (Facility ID: 37256)
FCC History Cards for WRLV (covering 1976-1980)

RLV
Defunct radio stations in the United States
Radio stations established in 1979
1979 establishments in Kentucky
Radio stations disestablished in 2017
2017 disestablishments in Kentucky
Salyersville, Kentucky
RLV
RLV